The City of Camberwell was a local government area about  east of Melbourne, the state capital of Victoria, Australia.

History

Camberwell was first incorporated as the Boroondara Road District on 11 July 1864, which became the Shire of Boroondara on 17 November 1871. At this point, Camberwell consisted of two small settlements; one near the Camberwell Inn and the other to the east, at Hartwell. Much of the shire's area was under cultivation, with a few sites for fine residences at the northern end.

The shire was renamed to the Shire of Camberwell and Boroondara on 16 May 1905. It became a borough on 28 April 1905, a town on 15 May 1906, and was proclaimed a city on 20 April 1914.

The council's pathway to amalgamation was different from most. Following a redevelopment deal for land behind the Burke Road shops, the council reneged on the deal and had over $24 million damages awarded against it. Combined with an investigation which revealed serious governance breaches and other issues, all councillors were sacked and replaced with a commissioner on 22 June 1993. At the same time, a major reform of local government in Victoria was taking place, and the decision was made to merge Camberwell with the Cities of Hawthorn and Kew into the newly created City of Boroondara, which took effect on 22 June 1994.

Council meetings were held at the Camberwell Town Hall, on Camberwell Road, Camberwell. It presently serves as the council seat for the City of Boroondara.

Wards

The City of Camberwell was subdivided into four wards on 22 May 1934:

 North East Ward
 North West Ward
 Centre Ward
 South Ward

Each of the four wards elects three councillors. Unlike present day multi-councillor wards, each election was staggered, with only one councillor per ward up for election at a time, and an election every year.

Suburbs
 Ashburton
 Balwyn
 Balwyn North
 Burwood (shared with the Cities of Box Hill and Waverley)
 Camberwell*
 Canterbury
 Glen Iris (shared with the Cities of Malvern and Hawthorn)
 Surrey Hills (shared with the City of Box Hill)

* Council seat.

Population

* Estimate in the 1958 Victorian Year Book.

Further reading

Camberwell Conservation Study (1991)

References

External links
 Victorian Places - Camberwell

Camberwell
City of Boroondara
1994 disestablishments in Australia
1864 establishments in Australia